is a railway station on the Ban'etsu West Line in the city of Kitakata, Fukushima Prefecture,  Japan, operated by East Japan Railway Company (JR East).

Lines

Station layout
Kitakata Station has a single side platform and a single island platform connected to the station building by a footbridge. The station has a Midori no Madoguchi staffed ticket counter.

Platforms

History
Kitakata Station opened on January 20, 1904. The station was absorbed into the JR East network upon the privatization of the Japanese National Railways (JNR) on April 1, 1987.

Passenger statistics
In fiscal 2017, the station was used by an average of 909 passengers daily (boarding passengers only).

Surrounding area
 Kitakata City Hall
 Kitakata Post Office

See also
 List of railway stations in Japan

References

External links

 JR East Station information 

Railway stations in Fukushima Prefecture
Ban'etsu West Line
Railway stations in Japan opened in 1904
Kitakata, Fukushima